The 1930 Tour de Hongrie was the fifth edition of the Tour de Hongrie cycle race and was held from 4 to 8 September 1930. The race started and finished in Budapest. The race was won by Vasco Bergamaschi.

Route

General classification

References

1930
Tour de Hongrie
Tour de Hongrie